Anthony Schlegel (born March 1, 1981) is an American football coach and former linebacker. He previously served as the assistant strength and conditioning coach at Ohio State University from 2011 to 2015 and was the head strength and conditioning coach for the Jacksonville Jaguars in 2021.

Schlegel played college football at The Ohio State University after transferring from the United States Air Force Academy and was drafted by the New York Jets in the third round of the 2006 NFL Draft. In January 2011, Schlegel returned to his college alma mater as an assistant strength and conditioning coach for the Buckeyes. He also played for the Cincinnati Bengals and the Florida Tuskers of the independent UFL.

Early years
Schlegel attended Highland Park High School. He was a state champion in high school wrestling.

Playing career

College
Schlegel began his college career at the United States Air Force Academy but transferred to Ohio State University after his sophomore season. While at the Academy, Schlegel served as the team's co-captain, earning all-conference honors. During his 2004 season, he was ranked third in the Ohio State defense with 84 tackles and in 2005 he was ranked second with 82 tackles.

National Football League (NFL)

New York Jets
Schlegel was drafted by the New York Jets in the third round (76th overall) of the 2006 NFL Draft. He made his debut at the Chicago Bears on November 19. On September 1, 2007 the Jets released him.

Cincinnati Bengals
On September 2, 2007, Schlegel was signed by the Bengals. He made his Bengals debut versus the New England Patriots on October 1 and made three tackles. On May 1, 2008, the Bengals released him.

United Football League (UFL)

Florida Tuskers
Schlegel was drafted by the Florida Tuskers on the UFL Premiere Season Draft in 2009 and signed with the team on September 3. He played for the Tuskers through the 2010 season.

Coaching career

Ohio State
Following the end of his playing career, Schlegel was hired by his alma mater, Ohio State, as an assistant strength and conditioning coach in January 2011. On September 27, 2014, he received media attention for body slamming Anthony Wunder, a fan who ran onto the field.

Jacksonville Jaguars
On January 18, 2021, Schelegel was hired by the Jacksonville Jaguars as their head strength and conditioning coach, reuniting with head coach Urban Meyer.

Personal life
Schlegel founded his own fitness company, Schlegel Hardcore Elite Training.

In 2020, he became a morning radio host on WBNS-FM, 97.1 The Fan  with fellow Ohio State linebacker Bobby Carpenter.

References

External links
New York Jets bio
Ohio State Buckeyes bio
Schlegel Hardcore Elite Training homepage 

1981 births
Living people
American people of German descent
American football linebackers
Ohio State Buckeyes football players
New York Jets players
Cincinnati Bengals players
Florida Tuskers players
Jacksonville Jaguars coaches
Ohio State Buckeyes football coaches